County of city (or county of a city) was a term used for certain local government areas in Scotland between 1890 and 1975 which performed the functions of both a county council and the town council of a burgh. There were four such areas, covering the cities of Aberdeen, Dundee, Edinburgh and Glasgow. Each area was governed by a city corporation (also known as a town council) and was administered independently of the surrounding county. The counties of cities were abolished by the Local Government (Scotland) Act 1973, and were replaced by regions and districts in 1975.

Formation 
When county councils were established under the Local Government (Scotland) Act 1889, the city of Edinburgh was already deemed to be a county of itself, having been given the right to appoint its own sheriff in 1482 making it independent from Midlothian, with the city being described as the "city and county of the city Edinburgh". Glasgow was subsequently designated as the next county of city in 1893. Dundee was designated the following year. Finally, Aberdeen was made a county of a city in 1900.

Powers 
Under the Local Government (Scotland) Act 1929, the counties of cities had powers over various matters including roads, education, police, public health, social services, planning and local taxation.

References 

Local government in Scotland
Cities in Scotland